Drink the Sea is the first studio album by American electronic music trio The Glitch Mob. It was released on Glass Air Records on May 25, 2010. It peaked at number 15 on the Billboard Top Dance/Electronic Albums chart, as well as number 39 on the Heatseekers Albums chart.

Track listing

Charts

References

External links
 
 

2010 debut albums
The Glitch Mob albums